In the midst of the strident public statements both for and against the legislation to establish a Reconciliation and Unity Commission with the power, subject to presidential approval, to compensate victims and pardon persons involved in the coup d'état which deposed the elected government in May 2000, a number of voices took more nuanced positions, or called for moderation and mutual understanding.

Religious groups 

A number of religious groups were at the forefront of calls for restraint in the rhetoric on both sides of the debate.  Others gave qualified approval, endorsing the bill's attempts to promote reconciliation but opposing its amnesty provisions.  At various points, calls for restraint and dialogue came from Father Beniamino Kaloudau, the Vicar-General of the Roman Catholic Church in Fiji, the Prison Fellowship ministry, the Plymouth Brethren denomination, the Fiji Council of Churches, and the Indian Division of the Methodist Church.  The Assemblies of God, for their part, endorsed the reconciliation proposals, but expressed deep reservations about the amnesty clauses.  Rev. Ame Tugaue, General Secretary of the Methodist Church, the nation's largest denomination comprising some 36 percent of the total population, including 66 percent of indigenous Fijians, said on 9 July that the church was reserving judgement on the bill itself until it could finish consulting its members, but was emphatically opposed to discontinuing the process of law.  On 19 October, however, he reversed this position, emphatically endorsed the bill, and criticized members of the church who opposed it.

Businesspeople and organizations 
 Taito Waradi, president of the Fijian Chamber of Commerce and Industry also said he supported the need for reconciliation, but called the proposed legislation a "man-made law" that would not work unless preceded by fundamental social changes.  On the one hand, indigenous Fijians needed to be integrated into the economic life of the country in order to break the "vicious cycle" of unrest and instability, he said on 18 May.  On the other hand, he insisted that it was necessary to promote and reinforce moral values. "No amount of legislation can guarantee lasting peace and stability if the people it is supposed to serve are not spiritually and emotionally prepared to live by them and where necessary defend them with their lives when it is breached.  Basic moral values must therefore first be internalised in the hearts and minds of its people before we can hope to enforce legislation reflecting these values.  We cannot begin to observe man-made laws if we do not have any moral values to start off with in the first place," he said.  Waradi suggested that rather than try to impose national reconciliation by legislative fiat, it would be better for the government to proclaim a National Conscience Week for the people to examine their hearts and come together to map out a way forward.
 Santal Maharaj of the New Zealand-based Fiji Human Rights Groups (NZ) said on 17 June that his organization supported the intentions of the bill, but was concerned that there was no precise definition of political crimes or victims.  "We agree with the good intentions of the Bill but the definitions of crimes of a political nature and the definition of victims arising out of political circumstances and of political nature must be left to the independent commission, without the minister pre-empting and having powers to issue any special directions later," Maharaj said.  Otherwise, the possibility existed of political interference and discrimination as to just who constituted a victim and qualified for compensation - a situation that had already arisen in other contexts, Maharaj said.

Politicians and chiefs 
 Meli Bogileka, General secretary of the People's National Party and a former Cabinet Minister in the Chaudhry government, who was held hostage by the followers of George Speight during the rebellion, called for changes to the bill.  While supporting the principle of reconciliation, he considered that compensation for the victims ought to take precedence over any amnesty for the perpetrators.  "To bring in clauses for amnesty within the framework of the Reconciliation Commission is a bit too much," he said on 15 May. This made the proposed compensation look too much like a payment for the amnesty, and would ignore the physical, psychological, and emotional trauma the victims had suffered.
 Militoni Leweniqila, a member of the executive of Rabuka's Soqosoqo ni Vakavulewa ni Taukei (SVT), said on 22 May that the proposal was, in fact, almost identical to one that Rabuka had put forth in 2002 as a way to move forward on the basis of reparations being paid and forgiveness being given.  It could start, he said, with an acknowledgement that Mahendra Chaudhry was the rightful Prime Minister of Fiji.  Facing up to the wrongs that had been committed would be essential, however.  On 30 May, however, he cautioned that the legislation failed to address the core problems that made national unity so elusive, which he said included the grievances of deposed Prime Minister Chaudhry and military commander Bainimarama. "The bill is four years too late and it has nothing that will attract these two to sit down and consider what the Government is proposing," Leweniqila said.  The government, he said, should genuinely approach Chaudhry and Bainimarama as the offended parties and deal with their cases separately.  He also accused the government of committing "too many blemishes and blunders," which he attributed to "inexperience."
 One chief from Ba Province, who spoke to the Fiji Times on condition of anonymity on 29 June, gave qualified support for the bill but said that the amnesty provisions were unacceptable.  He and other chiefs present at that Provincial Council meeting that day would support the bill, he said, if the amnesty clauses were excised.  They made the bill seem "wrongdoers oriented", and he did not want to be a party to it.
 Ratu Seru Seruvakula, Chairman of the Nasautoka sub-district of the Wainibuka district of Tailevu Province, also gave qualified approval.  The people of his district agreed that the bill was good, he said, but were less positive about the amnesty provisions.  The villagers believed that anybody breaking the law should face the consequences, Seruvakula said.
 Ratu Josaia Duacia, the Chief of Sikituru in Ba Province said on 5 July that a fundamental weakness of the bill lay in its failure to address the multicultural and multireligious character of Fiji.  Pointing out that its supporters promoted it as a reflection of Christianity, he questioned how it related to nonbelievers.  "How can we enforce a so-called Christian law on people that do not worship the Lord? Some of these people worship statues and idols so how do we expect them to follow a Christian Law?" he queried.  He supported the bill's objectives, but said these would be achievable only if the legislation took into account the opinions of everyone on the country.
 The Tui Ba Bulu, Ratu Sairusi Nagagavoka, said on 12 July that he was opposed to the decision by the Ba Provincial Council to endorse the legislation, saying that he preferred a neutral position.  He said that the decision to support the bill would only create more division among the indigenous communities of the province.  Reports that the chiefs of Ba Province had endorsed the bill unanimously were misleading, he said.  Many chiefs had been absent from the Lautoka meeting on 5 July; at the last gathering of all chiefs, on 30 June, the chiefs had been divided over whether to support the bill or not.  He accused the Council Chairman, Ratu Ovini Bokini, of having manipulated the council into supporting the legislation.

 Bokini responded on 14 July, saying that the council decision had indeed been unanimous. While stating that Ratu Nagagavoka was entitled to his opinion, he said it was a very sensitive issue and he thought it important not to create any "misunderstanding" by giving the impression of disunity among the chiefs of the province.  A "thorough and lengthy discussion" among members had, he said, culminated in a unanimous decision to support the bill.

International organizations 
The Asia Pacific League for Freedom and Democracy, a branch of the World League for Freedom and Democracy, said on 4 November that it hoped the legislation, and any amendments to it, would not undermine freedom, democracy, or the role of the judiciary.  The UN-affiliated body, established in the early 1950s to counter communist expansion, had held its 51st conference in Nadi, Fiji, the previous week.

Politics of Fiji